Mohsen Al-Hashemi (Arabic:محسن الهاشمي) (born 25 October 1990) is an Emirati footballer who plays as a goalkeeper, most recently for Baniyas.

References

External links
 

Emirati footballers
1990 births
Living people
Association football goalkeepers
Al Wahda FC players
Baniyas Club players
UAE First Division League players
UAE Pro League players